The First Ministry of Manmohan Singh was the first Union Council of Ministers of India under the Prime Ministership of Dr. Manmohan Singh. It was formed after the 2004 Indian general election held in four phases during 20 April - 10 May 2004, to elect the 14th Lok Sabha, and it functioned from 2004 to May 2009. After the election Singh took the oath as the Prime Minister of India on 22 May 2004, and continued to hold the post till full term, the next Council of Ministers of the Republic of India was sworn in on 22 May 2009, when Singh started his second term in office as PM.

With three female Cabinet ministers, the Manmohan Singh ministry was the first Indian government to appoint more than one female Cabinet minister.

Overview

This is a list of members of the Union Cabinet of the Government of India, 2004 to May 2009.

All ministers are based in offices of their respective Union Ministries in New Delhi. All Cabinet members are mandated by the constitution to be members of either house of the Parliament of India. In a departure from the norm the current Prime Minister, Manmohan Singh, is a member of the Upper House, the Rajya Sabha, and has remained so for the duration of his entire term (2004–2009).

There are three categories of ministers, in descending order of rank:
 Union Cabinet Minister - Senior minister in-charge of a ministry. A Cabinet minister may also hold additional charges of other Ministries, where no other Cabinet minister is appointed
 Minister of State (Independent Charge)- with no overseeing Union Cabinet Minister for that portfolio
 Minister of State (MoS) - junior minister with an overseeing Cabinet Minister, usually tasked with a specific responsibility in that ministry. For instance, an MoS in the Finance Ministry may only handle Taxation

Council of ministers

Cabinet Ministers

!style="width:17em"| Remarks

Ministers of State (Independent charge) 

!style="width:17em"| Remarks

Ministers of State

!style="width:17em"| Remarks

Demographics of the Council of Ministers 
UPA Cabinet by Party

See also
 United Progressive Alliance
 2008 Lok Sabha vote of confidence

References

External links 
 Council of Ministers--Official link

Indian union ministries
2004 establishments in India
Manmohan Singh administration
2009 disestablishments in India
Cabinets established in 2004
Cabinets disestablished in 2009
Council of Ministers of India
Nationalist Congress Party
Telangana Rashtra Samithi
Pattali Makkal Katchi
Dravida Munnetra Kazhagam
Jharkhand Mukti Morcha
Lok Janshakti Party
Indian Union Muslim League
Indian National Congress